Intelsat 801 is a geosynchronous communications spacecraft that was launched on March 01, 1997 by an Ariane 44L rocket from Kourou in French Guiana to provide voice and video communications to the member countries in that consortium after parking at 174° E longitude. It carries 38 C Band and 6 Ku Band transponders. It was built for US$76 million, launched for US$86 million and insured for US$27 million.

Specifications 
 Stabilization: 3-axis
 Propulsion: 2 × LEROS-1B
 Transponders: 38 C band / 6 
 Power: C band 7-38 W /  43 W
 EIRP: 52.6-44.0 dBW (spot 1) / 51.6-44.0 dBW (spot 2)
 Bandwidth: C band 36 and 72 MHz /  72 MHz and 112 MHz

See also 
 Graveyard orbit

References 

Spacecraft launched in 1997
Intelsat satellites